Arne Jørgen Aasen (born 15 October 1939) is a Norwegian chemist and professor emeritus at the University of Oslo, School of Pharmacy. Aasen received his engineering degree in biochemistry and organic chemistry in 1964, and a doctorate (dr. ing.)  in organic chemistry in August 1966 from The Norwegian Institute of Technology, Trondheim (renamed Norwegian University of Science and Technology in 1996).  In 1972 he defended his thesis for a doctorate (tekn. dr.) at The Royal Institute of Technology, Stockholm, Sweden.

In 1972 Aasen was appointed as unpaid associate professor ("oavlönad dosent") in organic chemistry at Royal Institute of Technology in Stockholm. Three years later Aasen was employed as a dosent in general and pharmaceutical organic chemistry at the School of Pharmacy in the University of Oslo, where except for two periods, he was a member of the staff until his retirement in 2007.

In 1979 Aasen became a professor in organic chemistry at the University of Tromsø, Department of Chemistry, and in 1983 professor in chemistry at the Norwegian College of Agriculture (the Norwegian University of Life Sciences after 1995), Institute of Chemistry, Ås. He was an employee at the University of Tromsø and the Norwegian College of Agriculture for two and five years, respectively. 

Aasen was contacted in 2017 by associated professor Aman Dekebo who suggested collaboration re structural elucidations, structure-activity studies of compounds from the resin of Commophora africana which is used in traditional medicine. The results were published in 2020 
<ref>Worku Dinku (Ethiopia), Johan Isaksson (Sverige), Fredrik Garnås Rylandsholm (Norge), Petr Bouř (Czech Republic), Eva Brichtová (Czech Republic), Sang Un Choi (Republic of South Korea), Sang-Ho Lee (Republic of South Korea), Young-Sik Jung (Republic of South Korea), Zae Sung No (Ethiopia), John Sigurd Mjøen Svendsen (UiT), Arne Jørgen Aasen (UiT og UiO), and Dr. Aman Dekebo, corresponding author and leader of the project. 
Anti-proliferative activity of a novel tricyclic triterpenoid acid from Commiphora africana resin against four human cancer cell lines
Applied Biological Chemistry 63, Article number: 16 (2020) 
https://doi.org/10.1186/s13765-020-00499-w</ref>

o the University of Oslo School of Pharmacy in 1988 as professor in his previous field. Arne Jørgen Aasen was appointed professor II in natural products chemistry at the University of Tromsø, School of Pharmacy from 1996 to 2007.Arne Jørgen Aasen, 70 years. Aftenposten Kultur, October 15, 2009, page 13 (in Norwegian; ex Aftenposten´s archives)

Aasen has held a number of research positions abroad. He was a research scientist with Commonwealth Scientific and Industrial Research Organisation in Melbourne, Australia, postdoctoral fellow and research associate in professor Ralph T. Holman´s group at The Hormel Institute, University of Minnesota, Austin, Minnesota, USA. Professor Ralph T. Holman published the first paper describing the well known omega-3 nomenclature in 1964. Aasen was appointed research scientist at the Research Department of Swedish Tobacco Co., Stockholm, Sweden. He has also been visiting professor at ARCO (Atlantic Richfield Company) Plant Cell Research Institute, Dublin, California, USA. and at Nycomed Salutar Inc., Sunnyvale, California, USA.

Aasen´s research areas include determination of the absolute configurations of racemic drugs,Stinson, S. C., Counting on Chiral Drugs. Chemical & Engineering News 76(38) (Sept. 21, 1998), pp. 83 - 104Stinson, S. C., Chiral Pharmaceuticals. Chemical & Engineering News 79(40) (Oct. 01, 2001) pp. 79 - 97 isolation, structural determination and syntheses of natural products, e.g. carotenoids and pyrrolizidine alkaloids, mass spectrometry of specifically deuterium-labelled wax esters, fatty acids and triglycerides,McMurry, J., Organic Chemistry With Biological Applications. Second edition, Brooks/Cole, Cengage Learning, Belmont, CA, USA, (2011), pp. 937 - 940 and identification and syntheses of flavour constituents from tobacco and other plants.

Aasen was from 1979 to 1981 responsible for the establishment of a section for organic chemistry at University of Tromsø. During the period 1989 to 2002 Aasen was head of the Department of Medicinal Chemistry, School of Pharmacy, University of Oslo.

Aasen has participated in about twenty lawsuits dealing with drugs and patent infringements either as an expert co-judge of Borgarting Court of Appeal, the District Courts of Asker and Bærum, Follo, and Oslo, or an expert for one of the parties in Norway and in New York, USA. He has since 2000 been consultant for the Norwegian registries of drugs used in human and veterinary medicine.

 Academic distinctions 
 In 1988 Aasen was called upon to a membership of the Royal Norwegian Society of Sciences and Letters, Trondheim, Norway. 
 Aasen has been a member of the International Advisory Board, Bulletin of the Chemical Society of Ethiopia'' since 2000.

References

External links 
Publications in Cristin

1939 births
Living people
Norwegian natural scientists
Norwegian chemists
Norwegian Institute of Technology alumni
Academic staff of the University of Tromsø
Academic staff of the Norwegian College of Agriculture
Academic staff of the University of Oslo
Royal Norwegian Society of Sciences and Letters
20th-century Norwegian scientists
21st-century Norwegian scientists
20th-century Norwegian educators
21st-century Norwegian educators